Uncial 0282 (in the Gregory-Aland numbering), is a Greek uncial manuscript of the New Testament. Palaeographically it has been assigned to the 6th century.

Description 
The codex contains a small parts of the Epistle to the Philippians 2:24-27; 3:6-8, on 1 parchment leaf. The text is written in two columns per page, 27 lines per page, in uncial letters.

The leaf survived in a fragmentary condition. It is a palimpsest.

Currently it is dated by the INTF to the 6th century.

Location 
It is one of the manuscripts discovered in Saint Catherine's Monastery, Sinai in May 1975, during restoration work. Currently the codex is housed at the monastery (N.E. ΜΓ 29a).

See also 
 List of New Testament uncials
 Biblical manuscript
 Textual criticism

References

Further reading 

 

Greek New Testament uncials
6th-century biblical manuscripts
Palimpsests